{{DISPLAYTITLE:C2H10B2}}
The molecular formula C2H10B2 (molar mass: 55.72 g/mol, exact mass: 56.0969 u) may refer to:

 1,1-Dimethyldiborane
 1,2-Dimethyldiborane